INSAT-1A was an Indian communications satellite which formed part of the Indian National Satellite System. Launched in 1982, it was operated in geostationary orbit at a longitude of 74° east. Following a series of failures, the satellite was abandoned in September 1982, less than 6 months into a seven-year mission.

Built by Ford Aerospace and operated by the Indian National Satellite System, INSAT-1A was based upon a custom satellite bus developed for the INSAT-1 series. The spacecraft carried 12 C and 3 S band transponders, powered by a single solar array.

NASA was contracted to launch INSAT-1A using a Delta 3910 rocket with a PAM-D upper stage. The launch occurred at 06:47 UTC on 10 April 1982, from Launch Complex 17A at Cape Canaveral Air Force Station. The satellite was successfully inserted into geosynchronous transfer orbit, from which it raised itself into geostationary orbit. It received the International Designator 1982-031A and Satellite Catalog Number 13129.

Following launch, INSAT-1A had some initial problems deploying its antennas, solar array and stabilisation boom. The C-band antenna could not be deployed for twelve days, and the solar array failed to extend fully, preventing the spacecraft generating enough power to conduct weather observation. The satellite's S-band transponders subsequently overheated and failed. The stabilisation boom failed to deploy altogether.

Early in the satellite's mission a fault in a valve in its attitude control system was detected which caused the spacecraft to expend propellant at a greater rate than expected. On 4 September 1982 the satellite's primary earth-tracking sensor was temporarily deactivated to protect the system while the sun passed through its field of view. Owing to the failure of the stabilisation boom, the backup sensor was not oriented in the correct direction, instead being oriented towards the moon, which overloaded it and shut down the sensor. The satellite exhausted its remaining propellant supply trying to regain earth-lock, and was abandoned on 6 September. Due to the sudden nature of its failure, INSAT-1A was not removed from geosynchronous orbit.

References

INSAT satellites
Spacecraft launched in 1982
1982 in India
Derelict satellites orbiting Earth